Oswald "Baba" Brooks (born c.1935) was a trumpet player who played jazz in the 1950s with the Eric Dean orchestra and recorded during the 1960s original Jamaican ska era for producers Duke Reid, Sonia Pottinger and her husband Lindon, King Edwards, and Prince Buster.

Biography
Brooks was born in Kingston, Jamaica, around 1935. He played trumpet on recording sessions from the late 1950s onwards, often uncredited, and formed his own band in the early 1960s, having a hit in 1962 with "Independence Ska", which celebrated Jamaica's break from colonialism. He also performed on several sessions with the Skatalites. He had further hits in 1964 with "Bus Strike" and "Musical Workshop". The band followed this in 1965 with "Guns Fever", recorded at Studio One. Brooks and his band continued to play on recording sessions until the early 1970s.

Albums

Songs
"King Size", B-side to the Saints' 'Brown Eyes'

References

External links
 Ska2soul.net: Oswald Baba Brooks
Discography at Discogs

Jamaican trumpeters
Island Records artists
Living people
Musicians from Kingston, Jamaica
21st-century trumpeters
Year of birth missing (living people)